Clayden is a surname. Notable people with the surname include: 

Arthur Clayden (1829–1899), New Zealand journalist and emigration agent
Bertha Clayden (1881−1958), British police officer
Charles Clayden, English footballer 
George Clayden (1903–1990), Australian footballer
James Clayden, Australian director and painter
John Clayden (1904–1986), South African judge
Jonathan Clayden (born 1968), British chemist
JS Clayden (born 1971), British singer-songwriter
Pauline Clayden (born 1922), British ballerina
Peter Clayden (1827–1902), British journalist and author
Rodney Clayden (born 1945), British swimmer